The Studebaker National Museum is a museum in South Bend, Indiana, United States, that displays a variety of automobiles, wagons, carriages, and military vehicles related to the Studebaker Corporation and other aspects of American history.

Layout

The Studebaker National Museum is connected to and shares an entrance with The History Museum as part of The Museums at Washington and Chapin. Visitors can purchase a ticket to visit one or both museums.

The Studebaker museum consists of three floors. The main level displays Studebaker history and vehicles from the 1800s to 1934. The upper level displays vehicles from 1934 onward. The lower level displays military vehicles and equipment and additional vehicles in "viewable storage" (stacked on lifts but still viewable). A secondary area on the main level displays family history of the Studebakers and the Olivers, South Bend makers of the Oliver Chilled Plow and other farm equipment.

The collection

Most of the museum's collection was part of the historic company's collection, although vehicles continue to be added from time to time. It includes more than 70 vehicles and numerous photos and displays as well as huge archive of photos and documents not on display. Although the collection focuses on the century-long history of the Studebaker corporation and the wagons, cars, trucks, and military vehicles it produced, the collection also includes a variety of other vehicles and products made locally.

Highlights of the collection include:
 A broad variety of Studebaker production vehicles and concept cars
 Some Packard production and concept cars, reflecting Studebaker's merger with Packard
 The carriage used by President Abraham Lincoln, along with the carriages of several other U.S. presidents and dignitaries
 A Conestoga wagon of the sort used by pioneers to cross the Great Plains
 A 1902 Studebaker Electric
 Studebaker military vehicles built during World War I and World War II
 Several Hummer vehicles including the Humvee, which are manufactured by South Bend-based AM General at its plant in the adjacent city of Mishawaka, Indiana
 A specially-painted Studebaker Champion 2-door sedan used in the filming of The Muppet Movie

Location
In November 2005, the museum opened a new building on Chapin Street, attached to The History Museum. The new building for the museum was designed on the architectural styling of many of the older Studebaker factory buildings in the area.

See also
 List of automobile manufacturers

External links

 The Studebaker National Museum
 The History Museum

Automobile museums in Indiana
Studebaker
History museums in Indiana
Museums in South Bend, Indiana